Centaurium scilloides, also known as perennial centaury is a flowering plant in the family Gentianaceae. It is native to Atlantic Europe (England, western France and the northwestern Iberian Peninsula) and the Azores. Plants from the Azores have white flowers (as opposed to pink) and are genetically different with some treating it as a different species.

Description
It is a perennial, herbaceous species, growing to a maximum height of 15cm.

Habitat and distribution
Centaurium scilloides is found on coastal cliffs and dunes grassland. It grows all along the Atlantic coast of Europe.

It became extinct in England in 1967, but held on in Wales, and there are recent sightings of it in the south of England.

Conservation
As of 2001, its conservation status in 'Endangered' according to the IUCN.

References

scilloides
Flora of the Azores